St Margaret's Church is in Lonsdale Road, Halliwell, Bolton, Greater Manchester, England.  It is an active Anglican parish church in the deanery of Bolton, the archdeaconry of Bolton, and the diocese of Manchester.  Its benefice is united with that of Christ Church, Heaton.

History

St Margaret's was built in 1911–13, and was designed by the Lancaster architects Austin and Paley.  In 1939 the same architects added a vestry and offices to the church.  Its interior was subdivided in 1982 to form separate rooms at the west end.

Architecture

The church is constructed in stone, with a plan consisting of a nave with a clerestory, north and south aisles, a south porch, a southeast porch, a chancel, and a southeast chapel with a canted east end.  The tracery in the windows is in free Decorated style.  Inside the church, the arcades are carried on alternate round and octagonal piers.  The reredos dates from 1954 and contains mosaic and opus sectile.  The stained glass includes the east window of 1937 by James Powell and Sons, a window on the north side of the church depicting Saint Margaret dated 1966 by Edith Norris, and a double window on the south side dating from 1921 by Humphries, Jackson and Ambler.

See also

List of churches in Greater Manchester
List of ecclesiastical works by Austin and Paley (1895–1914)
List of ecclesiastical works by Austin and Paley (1916–44)

References
Citations

Sources

 

Halliwell
Halliwell
Austin and Paley buildings
Gothic Revival church buildings in England
Gothic Revival architecture in Greater Manchester
20th-century Church of England church buildings
Buildings and structures in Bolton